The 2020 GT Cup Championship was the 14th GT Cup Championship, a British sports car championship. The season began on 11 July at Snetterton Circuit and ended on 25 October at Donington Park, after twenty races held over five meetings.

Calendar

Entry List
Classes:
GTO: Open specification cars
GT3: GT3 cars
GTA: Cup (Ginetta G55 Supercup) cars
GTB: GT Cup (Porsche 991 GT3 Cup Gen 1, Marcos Mantis) cars
GTC: GT Cup (Porsche 991 GT3 Cup Gen 2, Ferrari Challenge) cars
GTH: GT4 cars

Results

Overall championship standings

Points are awarded as follows:

(key)

‡ – Race 4 at Silverstone was stopped after 5 laps due to heavy rain and half points were awarded.

Class championship standings

Points are awarded as follows:

(key)

‡ – Race 4 at Silverstone was stopped after 5 laps due to heavy rain and half points were awarded.

Notes

References

External links

Sports car racing series
GT Cup